Mansions EP is the second release from the band Mansions, released by Doghouse Records in 2008. The EP was intended as a teaser for the full-length album, New Best Friends, as it contains two tracks from the album, as well as two b-sides.

The physical edition of the EP contains enhanced content, including acoustic versions of "Not The First Time" and "The Worst Part", and a video of a Q&A with lead vocalist Christopher Browder.

The EP was produced, engineered, and mixed by Mike Sapone, known for his work with Taking Back Sunday and Brand New. Mastering was done by Fred Kevorkian, known for his work with Willie Nelson, The Apples in Stereo, Maroon 5, Joseph Arthur, The National, and more.

Track listing 
 "The Worst Part" – 3:28
 "Take It Back" – 3:16
 "Tangerine" – 4:30
 "The Biggest Lie" – 4:11

References

2008 debut EPs
Mansions (band) albums
Albums produced by Mike Sapone
Doghouse Records EPs